Hypophosphorous acid (HPA), or phosphinic acid, is a phosphorus oxyacid and a powerful reducing agent with molecular formula H3PO2. It is a colorless low-melting compound, which is soluble in water, dioxane  
and alcohols.  The formula for this acid is generally written H3PO2, but a more descriptive presentation is HOP(O)H2, which highlights its monoprotic character.  Salts derived from this acid are called hypophosphites.

HOP(O)H2 exists in equilibrium with the minor tautomer HP(OH)2.  Sometimes the minor tautomer is called hypophosphorous acid and the major tautomer is called phosphinic acid.

Preparation and availability
Hypophosphorous acid was first prepared in 1816 by the French chemist Pierre Louis Dulong (1785–1838).

The acid is prepared industrially via a two step process: Firstly, elemental white phosphorus reacts with alkali and alkaline earth hydroxides to give an aqueous solution of hypophosphites:

P4 + 4 OH− + 4 H2O → 4  + 2 H2

Any phosphites produced in this step can be selectively precipitated out by treatment with calcium salts. The purified material is then treated with a strong, non-oxidizing acid (often sulfuric acid) to give the free hypophosphorous acid:

 + H+ → H3PO2

HPA is usually supplied as a 50% aqueous solution. Anhydrous acid cannot be obtained by simple evaporation of the water, as the acid readily oxidises to phosphorous acid and phosphoric acid and also disproportionates to phosphorous acid and phosphine. Pure anhydrous hypophosphorous acid can be formed by the continuous extraction of aqueous solutions with diethyl ether.

Properties

The molecule displays P(═O)H to P–OH tautomerism similar to that of phosphorous acid; the P(═O) form is strongly favoured.

HPA is usually supplied as a 50% aqueous solution and heating at low temperatures (up to about 90°C) prompts it to react with water to form phosphorous acid and hydrogen gas.

 H3PO2 + H2O → H3PO3 + H2

Heating above 110°C causes hypophosphorous acid to undergo disproportionation to give phosphorous acid and phosphine.

 3 H3PO2 → 2 H3PO3 + PH3

Reactions

Inorganic
Hypophosphorous acid can reduce chromium(III) oxide to chromium(II) oxide:

H3PO2 + 2 Cr2O3 → 4 CrO + H3PO4

Inorganic derivatives
Most metal-hypophosphite complexes are unstable, owing to the tendency of hypophosphites to reduce metal cations back into the bulk metal. Some examples have been characterised, including the important nickel salt [Ni(H2O)6](H2PO2)2.

DEA List I chemical status
Because hypophosphorous acid can reduce elemental iodine to form hydroiodic acid, which is a reagent effective for reducing ephedrine or pseudoephedrine to methamphetamine, the United States Drug Enforcement Administration designated hypophosphorous acid (and its salts) as a List I precursor chemical effective November 16, 2001.  Accordingly, handlers of hypophosphorous acid or its salts in the United States are subject to stringent regulatory controls including registration, recordkeeping, reporting, and import/export requirements pursuant to the Controlled Substances Act and 21 CFR §§ 1309 and 1310.

Organic
In organic chemistry,  H3PO2 can be used for the reduction of arenediazonium salts, converting  to Ar–H.  When diazotized in a concentrated solution of hypophosphorous acid, an amine substituent can be removed from arenes.

Owing to its ability to function as a mild reducing agent and oxygen scavenger it is sometimes used as an additive in Fischer esterification reactions, where it prevents the formation of colored impurities.

It is used to prepare phosphinic acid derivatives.

Applications
Hypophosphorous acid (and its salts) are used to reduce metal salts back into bulk metals. It is effective for various transition metals ions (i.e. those of: Co, Cu, Ag, Mn, Pt) but is most commonly used to reduce nickel. This forms the basis of electroless nickel plating (Ni–P), which is the single largest industrial application of hypophosphites. For this application it is principally used as a salt (sodium hypophosphite).

Sources

 ChemicalLand21 Listing

References

Hydrogen compounds
Phosphorus oxoacids

Reagents for organic chemistry
Reducing agents